The 35th Academy Awards, honoring the best in film for 1962, were held on April 8, 1963, at the Santa Monica Civic Auditorium in Santa Monica, California, hosted by Frank Sinatra.

The year's most successful film was David Lean's Lawrence of Arabia, with 10 nominations and 7 wins, including Best Picture and Lean's second win for Best Director. For his role as T.E. Lawrence, Peter O'Toole received his first of eight career nominations for Best Actor, all unsuccessful; as of the 94th Academy Awards, O'Toole and Glenn Close share the record for the most acting nominations with no wins. To date, Lawrence of Arabia is the only Best Picture winner with no female speaking roles.

Arthur Penn's The Miracle Worker earned the rare distinction of winning two acting Oscars (Best Actress for Anne Bancroft and Best Supporting Actress for Patty Duke) without a nomination for Best Picture. The only other film to do this to date was Hud, the following year.

Ceremony
The Best Actress Oscar occasioned the last act of the long-running feud between Joan Crawford and Bette Davis. They had starred together for the first time in  What Ever Happened to Baby Jane?, a surprise hit the previous summer. Davis was nominated for her role as the title character, a faded child star who humiliates the wheelchair-using sister who eclipsed her fame in adulthood, while Crawford was not.

Crawford told the other nominated actresses that, as a courtesy, she would accept their awards for them should they be unavailable on the night of the ceremony. Davis did not object as her rival had often done this, but, on the night of the ceremony, she was livid when Crawford took the stage to cheerfully accept the award on behalf of Anne Bancroft, who had a Broadway commitment. Davis believed that Crawford had told other Oscar voters to vote for The Miracle Worker star in order to upstage her. The rekindled animosity between the two resulted in Crawford leaving the cast of Hush...Hush, Sweet Charlotte, a planned follow-up to Baby Jane that began filming the next summer, early in production.

Awards 

Nominations announced on February 25, 1963. Winners in each category are listed first and highlighted with boldface text.

Honorary Academy Awards

Jean Hersholt Humanitarian Award 
 Steve Broidy

Presenters and performers

Presenters 
 George Chakiris (Presenter: Best Supporting Actress)
 Wendell Corey (Presenter: Best Foreign Language Film)
 Joan Crawford (Presenter: Best Director)
 Bette Davis (Presenter: Writing Awards)
 Olivia de Havilland (Presenter: Best Picture)
 Van Heflin (Presenter: Short Subjects Awards)
 Audrey Hepburn and Eva Marie Saint (Presenter: Best Costume Design)
 Gene Kelly (Presenter: Best Art Direction)
 Sophia Loren (Presenter: Best Actor)
 Karl Malden (Presenter: Best Film Editing)
 Rita Moreno (Presenter: Best Supporting Actor)
 Donna Reed (Presenter: Best Cinematography)
 Ginger Rogers (Presenter: Best Original Score and Best Original Song)
 Maximilian Schell (Presenter: Best Actress)
 Miyoshi Umeki (Presenter: Documentary Awards)
 Shelley Winters (Presenter: Best Sound Recording and Best Special Effects)

Performers 
 Alfred Newman (musical director)
 Robert Goulet ("Days of Wine and Roses" from Days of Wine and Roses, "Love Song from Mutiny on the Bounty (Follow Me)" from Mutiny on the Bounty, "Song from Two for the Seesaw (Second Chance)" from Two for the Seesaw, "Tender Is the Night" from Tender Is the Night and "Walk on the Wild Side" from Walk on the Wild Side)

Multiple nominations and awards 

The following nineteen films received multiple nominations:

 10 nominations: Lawrence of Arabia
 8 nominations: To Kill a Mockingbird
 7 nominations: Mutiny on the Bounty
 6 nominations: The Music Man
 5 nominations: Days of Wine and Roses, The Longest Day, The Miracle Worker, and What Ever Happened to Baby Jane?
 4 nominations: Birdman of Alcatraz and The Wonderful World of the Brothers Grimm
 3 nominations: Divorce Italian Style, Gypsy, Sweet Bird of Youth, and That Touch of Mink
 2 nominations: Bon Voyage!, David and Lisa, Freud: The Secret Passion, The Manchurian Candidate, and Two for the Seesaw

The following four films received multiple awards:

 7 awards: Lawrence of Arabia
 3 awards: To Kill a Mockingbird
 2 awards: The Longest Day and The Miracle Worker

Notes 
A: During pre-production on Lawrence of Arabia, producer Sam Spiegel and director David Lean were unhappy with Michael Wilson's original screenplay, so Spiegel asked playwright Robert Bolt to rewrite the script, as Spiegel wanted to get the film rights of Bolt's play A Man for All Seasons. Bolt found the script lacking in good dialogue and also character depth. He essentially wrote the whole script, using T.E. Lawrence's book, The Seven Pillars of Wisdom, as his starting point. While Bolt rewrote the whole script, he still retained the characterization of all of the characters found in Wilson's original script. It was decided that Bolt would be credited as the sole writer of Lawrence of Arabia and not Wilson, because he was blacklisted at the time. The nomination for Wilson was granted on September 26, 1995, by the Academy Board of Directors, after research at the WGA found that the then-blacklisted writer shared the screenwriting credit with Bolt.

See also 
 5th Grammy Awards
 14th Primetime Emmy Awards
 15th Primetime Emmy Awards
 16th British Academy Film Awards
 17th Tony Awards
 20th Golden Globe Awards
 1962 in film

References

External links 
 The 35th Annual Academy Awards Synopsis at IMDb
 

1962 film awards
1962 awards in the United States
1963 in California
Academy Awards ceremonies
1963 in American cinema
April 1963 events in the United States
20th century in Santa Monica, California
Events in Santa Monica, California